Jaber Alwan (born 1948 in Babylon, Iraq) is an Italian artist and painter of Iraqi descent.

Biography
Born in Babylon, Iraq, in 1948, Alwan graduated from the Institute of Fine Art in Baghdad in 1970. In 1972 he arrived in Rome and started painting in the famous Piazza Navona.

In 1975 he gained a diploma degree in Sculpture from the Rome Academy of Fine Art. Ten years later the Municipality of Rome awarded him the prize of Best Artist, the first foreigner to receive this prize.

He has works on permanent display in the Museums of Modern Art of Baghdad, Damascus, Qatar and Kuwait, the Opera House of Culture in Cairo, also at the Gulbenkian Museum, Lisbon, the Dei Diameni Palace, Ferrara, and the Academy Museum, Ravenna; and has private collections in many cities in Europe, Russia, Japan and Chile.

Alwan lives in Rome, Italy.

Exhibitions
 1975 “La Giada” Gallery Rome Italy
 1976 “The Cross Library” Gallery Rome Italy
 1977 “The Hall of Plastic Artists “ Gallery Baghdad Iraq
 1978 “Studio Dell Arte” Gallery Rome Italy
 1978 “Ipotesi” Gallery Rome Italy
 1979 “La Perla” Gallery Florence Italy
 1985 “Leonardo da Vinci” Gallery Rome Italy
 1986 An Exhibition at his Studio Presented by “Giovanni Carandente” the Manager of Venice Penaly. Rome Italy
 1987 “Il Leone” Gallery Rome Italy
 1988 “Ornina” Gallery Damask Syria
 1988 “Mass Palass” Museum Vienna Austria
 1990 “Artemos” Gallery Bastogne Ballgame
 1991 “Kufa” Gallery London England
 1992 Liehrmann" Gallery Liege Ballgame
 1993 Vittorio Caporrella" Foundation Rome Italy
 1994 Liehrmann" Gallery Liege Ballgame
 1994 “Lombardi” Gallery Rome Italy
 1995 “Gallery Atassi” Damascus Syria
 1995 Abaad" Gallery Amman Jordan
 1995 “Sala” College Ronciglione Italy
 1995 “Green Art” Gallery Dubai The Arabian Emarat
 1995 “Communale” Gallery Founainebleau France
 1996 “Liehrmann” gallery Liege Ballgame
 1996 “Private Collection Art” Gallery Bahrain Bahrain
 1997 “Museum Loggetta Lombardesca” Ravenna Italy
 1997 Magazzino Del Sale" Cervia Italy
 1998 “Green Art” Gallery Dubai The Arabian Emarat
 1999 “Arte Contemporanea” gallery Foggia Italy
 1999 “ Museum Civico Vieste” Vieste Italy
 1999 “Atassi” Gallery Damascus Syria
 1999 “Leonardo da Vinci” Gallery Catania Italy
 2000 “Green Art” Gallery Dubai The Arabian Emarat
 2000 “Al-Mada” Gallery Damascus Syria
 2001 “XPO” gallery Beirut Lebanon
 2001 “M-Art” Gallery Vienna Austria
 2001 “Bilad Al Cham” gallery Halab Syria
 2002 “Liehrmann” gallery Liege Ballgame
 2002 “M-Art” Gallery Vienna Austria
 2003 “Al-Mada” Gallery Beirut Lebanon
 2004 “Grant” Gallery Cairo Egypt
 2004 “Al-Marsa” Gallery Tunis Tunis
 2005 “Museum of Art” Kuwait Kuwait
 2005 “Liehrmann” Gallery Liege Ballgame
 2005 “Al-Riwaq” Gallery Bahrain Bahrain
 2005 “Green Art” Gallery Dubai The Arabian Emarat
 2006  A solo exhibition at Dar Al Anda, Jordan

Group exhibitions
 1977 “Festival of International Art” Abbruzzo Italy
 1977 “From Rome To Tokyo” Exhibition Japan
 1981 “Iraqi Art” Rome Italy
 1983 “Women in Iraq Art” Regge amilia Italy
 1984 “Contemporary Iraqi Art” Brecht center,Milan Italy
 1984 A group of Iraqi and Iranian Artists for Peace Rome Italy
 1986 An Exhibition for a group of Italian and Foreign Artists Genezzano Italy
 1986 “International Gallery” Rome Italy
 1986 “Iraqi and Iranian Artists” Roma Italy
 1987 “Salone del Quotidiano” Rome Italy
 1987 “Anti Racial” Exhibition Rome Italy
 1988 “Punto 8” Gallery Florence Italy
 1988 “Iraqi Art” National Museum Damascus Syria
 1988 “Far away from the first Sky” Florence Italy
 1988 “Punto Gallery” Rome Italy
 1989 “Mass Palass” Museum Vienna Austria
 1989 “Palasso Valentine” Rome Italy
 1990 “Biennale di Bastogne” Bastogne Ballgame
 1993 “Il Torchio” Gallery Rome Italy
 1993 “Mass Palass” Museum Vienna Austria
 1995 “La Bottega” gallery Ravenna Italy
 1996 “Communale” Museum “The Italian Art” Liege Ballgame
 1997 Biennale di Rome “Palasso del Matto to “ Rome Italy
 1999 Bienale di Beirut Beirut Lebanon
 2003 Biennale di Cairo Cairo Egypt
 2004 Biennale di Tunis Tunis Tunis
 2005 “Adn- Kronos” Hall Rome Italy

References

External links
Official Site

Living people
1948 births
People from Hillah
Italian people of Iraqi descent
Italian contemporary artists
Iraqi painters
Italian painters